Walter Musakwa (born 13 September 1979) is a Zimbabwean cricket umpire. He has stood in domestic matches in the 2017–18 Logan Cup and the 2017–18 Pro50 Championship tournaments.

References

External links
 

1979 births
Living people
Zimbabwean cricket umpires
Place of birth missing (living people)